In Greek mythology, Argeus ( means "the hunter") or Argius (Ἀργεῖος Argeius or Argeios) or  may refer to the following personages:

 Argeius or Argus, a king of Argos around 1600 BCE, and successor to Apis, king of Argos, according to Tatian.
 Argius, an Egyptian prince as one of the sons of King Aegyptus. His mother was a Phoenician woman and thus full brother of Agaptolemus, Cercetes, Aegius, Aegius, Archelaus and Menemachus. In some accounts, he could be a son of Aegyptus either by Eurryroe, daughter of the river-god Nilus, or Isaie, daughter of King Agenor of Tyre. Eurydamas suffered the same fate as his other brothers, save Lynceus, when they were slain on their wedding night by their wives who obeyed the command of their father King Danaus of Libya. He married the Danaid Evippe, daughter of Danaus either and an Ethiopian woman.
Argeus, one of the sons (in a rare version of the myth) of Phineus and Danaë, the other being Argus.
Argeus, a king of Argos
 Argeius, a Theban prince as one of the Niobids, children of Queen Niobe and King Amphion.
Argeios, an Elean prince as son of King Pelops and Hippodamia. He goes to Amyclae and married King Amyclas' daughter, Hegesandra and became the father of 3 sons: Melanion, Alector and Boethoos.
 Argeus, son of Licymnius and brother of Melas. He fell in battle fighting with Heracles against King Eurytus of Oechalia, a city of doubtful location.
 Argeius, a centaur who was driven mad by the smell of wine and subsequently killed by the demigod Heracles while the latter was visiting his friend, the centaur Pholus, some time between his third and fourth labors.
 Argeius, a (probably mythical) youth who competed at the ancient Nemean Games and Isthmian Games, recorded in the poems of Bacchylides.
Argius, one of the Suitors of Penelope who came from Dulichium along with other 56 wooers. He, with the other suitors, was killed by Odysseus with the help of Eumaeus, Philoetius, and Telemachus.
Argeus, son of Deiphontes, king of Argos, by his wife Hyrnetho.
 Argeus, a surname of Pan and Aristaeus

Notes

References 

 Apollodorus, The Library with an English Translation by Sir James George Frazer, F.B.A., F.R.S. in 2 Volumes, Cambridge, MA, Harvard University Press; London, William Heinemann Ltd. 1921. . Online version at the Perseus Digital Library. Greek text available from the same website.
 Bacchylides, Odes translated by Diane Arnson Svarlien. 1991. Online version at the Perseus Digital Library.
 Bacchylides, The Poems and Fragments. Cambridge University Press. 1905. Greek text available at the Perseus Digital Library.
 Diodorus Siculus, The Library of History translated by Charles Henry Oldfather. Twelve volumes. Loeb Classical Library. Cambridge, Massachusetts: Harvard University Press; London: William Heinemann, Ltd. 1989. Vol. 3. Books 4.59–8. Online version at Bill Thayer's Web Site
 Diodorus Siculus, Bibliotheca Historica. Vol 1-2. Immanel Bekker. Ludwig Dindorf. Friedrich Vogel. in aedibus B. G. Teubneri. Leipzig. 1888–1890. Greek text available at the Perseus Digital Library.
 Homer, The Odyssey with an English Translation by A.T. Murray, Ph.D. in two volumes. Cambridge, MA., Harvard University Press; London, William Heinemann, Ltd. 1919. . Online version at the Perseus Digital Library. Greek text available from the same website.
 Pausanias, Description of Greece with an English Translation by W.H.S. Jones, Litt.D., and H.A. Ormerod, M.A., in 4 Volumes. Cambridge, MA, Harvard University Press; London, William Heinemann Ltd. 1918. . Online version at the Perseus Digital Library
 Pausanias, Graeciae Descriptio. 3 vols. Leipzig, Teubner. 1903.  Greek text available at the Perseus Digital Library.
Tzetzes, John, Book of Histories, Book VII-VIII translated by Vasiliki Dogani from the original Greek of T. Kiessling's edition of 1826. Online version at theio.com

Sons of Aegyptus
Princes in Greek mythology
Suitors of Penelope
Phoenician characters in Greek mythology